Heathfield is an industrial estate in the Teignbridge district of Devon, England. It is located 2 miles south east of Bovey Tracey and is next to the A382 and A38 roads. In 2011 it had a population of 1832.

References 

Industrial parks in the United Kingdom
Buildings and structures in Devon
Bovey Tracey